The Ghost House is a 1917 American silent comedy film directed by William C. deMille and written by Beulah Marie Dix. The film stars Jack Pickford, Louise Huff, Olga Grey, James Neill, Eugene Pallette, and Horace B. Carpenter. The film was released on October 1, 1917, by Paramount Pictures. It is not known whether the film currently survives, which suggests that it is a lost film.

Plot
As described in a film magazine, Lois Atwell (Huff) and her widowed sister Alice (Grey), with no money left to pay their rent, go to live in a house left to them by their uncle which is known to be haunted. The same evening Ted Rawson (Pickford) is sent to spend the night in the haunted house as part of his college hazing. When the women hear someone breaking into the house they think he is a burglar and Lois holds Ted captive at the point of a gun. A real thief is also hiding in the house and when he sees the women trailing in their white gowns, he thinks they are ghosts and departs hastily. Although Lois doubts that Ted is a real housebreaker, she treats him as one until he can explain who he is and the police catch the actual criminal.

Cast 
Jack Pickford as Ted Rawson
Louise Huff as Lois Atwell
Olga Grey as Alice Atwell
James Neill as Jeremy Foster
Eugene Pallette as	Spud Foster
Horace B. Carpenter as James Clancy
Mrs. Lewis McCord as Dido
Edythe Chapman as Mrs. Rawson
Lillian Leighton as Mary Ellen Clancy

References

External links

 

1917 films
1910s English-language films
Silent American comedy films
1917 comedy films
Paramount Pictures films
Films directed by William C. deMille
American black-and-white films
American silent feature films
1910s American films